Froschgrundsee also known as Schönstädtspeicher is a retention basin to protect the city of Coburg in Bavaria from the flooding of the Itz, Effelder, and the Grümpen. It lies in the municipality of Rödental in Upper Franconia. Froschgrundsee was completed in 1986 after four years of construction and cost 43 million DM in operations.

References 

Geography of Bavaria
RFroschgrundsee